Vikash Singh (born 28 June 1994) is an Indian cricketer. He made his first-class debut for Jharkhand in the 2016–17 Ranji Trophy on 27 October 2016.

References

External links
 

1994 births
Living people
Indian cricketers
Jharkhand cricketers
People from Ranchi